Choi Nam-yeon (born 17 January 1943) is a South Korean speed skater. He competed in two events at the 1964 Winter Olympics.

References

1943 births
Living people
South Korean male speed skaters
Olympic speed skaters of South Korea
Speed skaters at the 1964 Winter Olympics
Speed skaters from Seoul